Territorial Council elections were held in French Somaliland on 23 November 1958. The result was a victory for the Defence of Economic and Social Interests of the Territory party, which won 25 of the 32 seats.

Electoral system
The elections were held using proportional representation. The country was divided into three constituencies; Djibouti electing 16 members, Tadjoura–Obock electing nine and Dikhil–Ali Sabieh electing seven.

Results

By ethnic group

References

French Somaliland
Legislative election
Elections in Djibouti
French Somaliland legislative election
Election and referendum articles with incomplete results